Col de Braus (1002 m) is a high mountain pass in the Alps in the department of Alpes-Maritimes in France.

It connects Sospel and L'Escarène. A railway tunnel has been dug under the pass.

See also
 List of highest paved roads in Europe
 List of mountain passes

References

Cycling Elevation Profile

Mountain passes of Provence-Alpes-Côte d'Azur
Mountain passes of the Alps